See also:
Pheromones